SF50 is an aircraft manufactured by Cirrus Aircraft.

SF50 may also refer to:

 Standard Form 50 (SF-50 Notification of Personnel Action)